Yator is a surname. Notable people with this surname include:

 Albert Yator (1993–2011), Kenyan long-distance runner
 Raymond Yator (born 1981), Kenyan steeplechase athlete
  (born 1982), Kenyan athletics competitor
  (born 1989), Kenyan runner